The Robur LO 1801 A is a forward control off-road truck, made by East German manufacturer VEB Robur-Werke Zittau. It was produced from 1965 to 1973, alongside the on-road model LO 2501. Unlike the on-road model, the LO 1801 A has all-wheel drive, which came at the cost of a reduced payload. LO 1801 A is an abbreviation for air-cooled otto, 1800 kg payload, all-wheel drive.

Like its predecessors, the LO 1801 A was used by the East German military, police, fire brigade, and open pit mining rescue service. Export versions were called Safari.

Technical description 

The LO 1801 A is a light, 1.8 tonne, two-axle, all-wheel-drive, body-on-frame, forward control truck with single tyres.

The frame has two U-section longitudinal members, as well as four tube, and two square-shaped crossmembers. It comes with only few grease nipples. Both front and rear axles are leaf sprung rigid live axles, only the front axle has hydraulic shock absorbers. Differentials with a reduction of 6:35 were installed. The steering system is a worm-and-lever steering system. All four wheels come with 9.00—20 inch rims, 10—20 inch extra tyres, and drum brakes. Robur installed a dual-circuit braking system. The cab is made of steel, has front-hinged doors, a split windscreen, and split A-pillars with narrow windows for improved visibility. Unlike the LO 2501, which only seats three, the Robur LO 1801 A seats four.

The gearbox is a manual, five-speed, dog-leg gearbox with synchromesh and helical gearing in gears 2–5. First and reverse are straight cut gears without synchromesh. The splitter gearbox is an unsynchronised, three-shaft gearbox with gearshift sleeves. It has an on-road gear, an off-road gear, and an additional gear for switching front-wheel drive. A dry diaphragm-spring single-disc clutch, type T20K/DZ, transmits the torque from the engine to the gearbox. The LO 1801 A is powered by an air-cooled, straight-four, OHV, carburetted LO 4/1 otto engine. It displaces 3.3 litres, and is rated .

Technical specifications

References

External links 

Robur trucks
IFA vehicles
Vehicles introduced in 1965